The eastern whip-poor-will (Antrostomus vociferus, also called "whip-o-will", "whip o' will", etc.) is a medium-sized (22–27 cm; 8.7-10.6 ins.) bird within the nightjar family, Caprimulgidae, from North America. The whip-poor-will is commonly heard within its range, but less often seen because of its camouflage. It is named onomatopoeically after its song.

Description

Adults have mottled plumage: the upperparts are grey, black and brown; the lower parts are grey and black. They have a very short bill and a black throat. Males have a white patch below the throat and white tips on the outer tail feathers; in the female, these parts are light brown.

This bird is sometimes confused with the related chuck-will's-widow (Antrostomus carolinensis) which has a similar but lower-pitched and slower call.

Ecology
Eastern whip-poor-wills breed in deciduous or mixed woods across central and southeastern Canada and the eastern United States, and migrate to the southeastern United States and to eastern Mexico and Central America for the winter. These birds forage at night, catching insects in flight, and normally sleep during the day. Eastern whip-poor-wills nest on the ground, in shaded locations among dead leaves, and usually lay two eggs at a time. The bird will commonly remain on the nest unless almost stepped upon.

The eastern whip-poor-will is becoming locally rare. Several reasons for the decline are proposed, such as loss of early successional forest habitat, habitat destruction, predation by feral cats and dogs, and poisoning by insecticides, but the actual causes remain elusive. Even with local populations endangered, the species as a whole is not considered globally threatened due to its large range.

The whip-poor-will has been split into two species. Eastern populations are now referred to as the eastern whip-poor-will. The disjunct population in southwestern United States and Mexico is now referred to as the Mexican whip-poor-will, Antrostomus arizonae. The two populations were split based on range, different vocalizations, different egg coloration, and DNA sequencing showing differentiation.

Conservation 

In 2017, the eastern whip-poor-will was uplisted from least concern to near threatened on the IUCN Red List, on the basis that based on citizen science observations, populations of the eastern whip-poor-will had declined by over 60% between 1970 and 2014. This decline is likely due to decreased forest disturbance and early successional forest habitat, pesticides and intensified agriculture, both of which have led to heavy declines in the flying insect populations that the eastern whip-poor-will depends on, as well as habitat loss. BirdLife International has stated that initiatives like the Conservation Reserve Program will be crucial in conserving the species and reversing its decline.

Cultural references

Due to its song, the eastern whip-poor-will is the topic of numerous legends.  A New England legend says the whip-poor-will can sense a soul departing, and can capture it as it flees. This is used as a plot device in H. P. Lovecraft's story The Dunwich Horror. Lovecraft based this idea on information of local legends given to him by Edith Miniter of North Wilbraham, Massachusetts when he visited her in 1928. This is likely related to an earlier Native American and general American folk belief that the singing of the birds is a death omen. This is also referred by "Whip-poor-will", a short story by James Thurber, in which the constant nighttime singing of a whip-poor-will results in maddening insomnia of the protagonist, Mr. Kinstrey, who eventually loses his mind and kills everyone in his house, including himself. The bird also features in "The Runaway Slave at Pilgrim's Point", a poem by the English poet Elizabeth Barrett Browning, in which the outcast speaker asks: "Could the whip-poor-will or the cat of the glen/Look into my eyes and be bold?"

It is also frequently used as an auditory symbol of rural America, as in Washington Irving's story "The Legend of Sleepy Hollow", or as a plot device.  For example, William Faulkner's short story, "Barn Burning", makes several mentions of whip-poor-wills, e.g.: "and then he found that he had been asleep because he knew it was almost dawn, the night almost over. He could tell that from the whip-poor-wills. They were everywhere now among the dark trees below him, constant and inflectioned and ceaseless, so that, as the instant for giving over to the day birds drew nearer and nearer, there was no interval at all between them."

"The Mountain Whippoorwill" is a poem written by Stephen Vincent Benét about a fiddling contest, won by Hillbilly Jim, who refers to his fiddle as a whip-poor-will and identifies the bird with the lonely and poor but vibrant life of the mountain people. American poet Robert Frost described the sound of a whip-poor-will in the fourth stanza of his 1915 poem "Ghost House". This is notable in Frost's use of assonance, in "The whippoorwill is coming to shout / And hush and cluck and flutter about."

Emily Dickinson wrote "Many a phrase has the English language -/ I have heard but one -/ [...]/ Saying itself in new inflection -/ Like a Whippowil -" (in: J276, 1861 = F333, 1862)

Many a phrase has the English language -
I have heard but one -
Low as the laughter of the Cricket,
Loud, as the Thunder's Tongue -
Murmuring, like old Caspian Choirs,
When the Tide's a'lull -
Saying itself in new inflection -
Like a Whippowil -

The chorus of George A. Whiting and Walter Donaldson's song "My Blue Heaven" (1927) begins, "When Whip-poor-wills call and ev'ning is nigh ..."

In the 1934 Frank Capra film It Happened One Night, before Clark Gable's character Peter Warne reveals his name to Ellie Andrews (Claudette Colbert), he famously says to her: "I am the whip-poor-will that cries in the night".

Hank Williams's 1949 song I'm So Lonesome I Could Cry refers to the whip-poor-will's sound in its opening line: "Hear that lonesome whippoorwill He sounds too blue to fly".. The chorus of Alan Jackson's 1992 single Midnight in Montgomery makes reference to this lyric: "Just hear that whippoorwill"

Elton John and Bernie Taupin's 1975 song "Philadelphia Freedom" features a flute mimicking the call of the eastern whip-poor-will and includes the lyrics "I like living easy without family ties, till the whippoorwill of freedom zapped me right between the eyes."

The Pennsylvania-based Indie rock band Dr Dog released their song "Lonesome" on their 2012 album Be the Void, featuring the passage "I had my fill of the Whippoorwill / When he broke into song I shot him".

The song, "Cockeyed Optimist", sung by Nellie Forbush in Rodger's and Hammerstein's South Pacific, mentions such bird, singing, "But every whip-poor-will / Is selling me a bill/ And telling me it just ain't so!"

In the novel Slapstick by Kurt Vonnegut, the narrator hears the call of a whip-poor-will, which the narrator referred to as a child as "The Nocturnal Goatsucker".

In the fifth episode of the Netflix animated series The Midnight Gospel, titled "Annihilation of Joy", the protagonist encounters a talking bird attached to a prisoner. The bird, voiced by Jason Louv, introduces itself as a "psychopomp or a whippoorwill" and explains the cycle of death and rebirth experienced by its charge, a prisoner caught in an "existential trap".

References

External links

 Whip-poor-will Species Account - Cornell Lab of Ornithology
 Whip-poor-will - Caprimulgus vociferus - USGS Patuxent Bird Identification InfoCenter

eastern whip-poor-wil
Nightjars
Native birds of the Eastern United States
Native birds of Eastern Canada
eastern whip-poor-wil
Taxa named by Alexander Wilson (ornithologist)